Monsters Resurrected is an American documentary television series that premiered on September 13, 2009, on the Discovery Channel. The program reconstructs extinct animals of both Mesozoic and Cenozoic. It is also called Mega Beasts.

Featured animals 
Creatures in bold are the featured animals of their episodes.

Acrocanthosaurus
Amphicyon ingens
Carcharodontosaurus
Cretoxyrhina mantelli
Daeodon (identified as Dinohyus)
Dallasaurus
Deinonychus
Diprotodon
Dolichorhynchops
Edward's wolf (Canis edwardii)
Epicyon haydeni
Hipparion
Marsupial lion (Thylacoleo carnifex)
Megalania
Megalonyx
Merychippus
Moropus
Neochoerus aesopi
Paralititan
Procoptodon goliah
Ramoceros
Rugops
Sarcosuchus
Sauropelta
Sauroposeidon (identified as Paluxysaurus)
Smilodon gracilis
Spinosaurus
Styxosaurus snowii
Tenontosaurus
Titanis
Tylosaurus proriger
Xiphactinus audax

Episodes

Home media
The complete 2-disc DVD was released on May 4, 2010 via Amazon.

References 

Discovery Channel original programming
Documentary films about prehistoric life
Documentary television series about dinosaurs